Irma Dolores Hernández Molina (born 17 June 2000) is a Salvadoran footballer who plays as a defender for Alianza FC and the El Salvador women's national team.

Club career
Hernández has played for Alianza FC in El Salvador.

International career
Hernández capped for El Salvador at senior level during the 2020 CONCACAF Women's Olympic Qualifying Championship qualification.

See also
List of El Salvador women's international footballers

References

2000 births
Living people
Salvadoran women's footballers
Women's association football defenders
El Salvador women's international footballers